"Strangers" is a single released by Canadian artist City and Colour on 21 June 2019, the second single released from A Pill for Loneliness. Dallas Green has said of the track in a statement “You’ll never really understand what it’s like to be inside someone else’s brain or heart. So, we need to appreciate the differences. If we do, maybe we can live better with one another.”

The music video was released on 8 August 2019, co-directed by Chris Verene and Michael Maxxis, who Green had previously collaborated with on Alexisonfire's video for Familiar Drugs.

Chart performance

References

External links

City and Colour songs
Songs written by Dallas Green (musician)
2019 singles
2019 songs